Lajos Markusovszky (1815–1893) surgeon, from 1857 founder and publisher of Orvosi Hetilap (Hungarian medical journal), later editor of the journal, after 1867 Advisor to the Ministry for Religion and Education regarding University affairs.

He is generally agreed to have been Ignaz Semmelweis's best friend.

References

 plate 11

1815 births
1893 deaths
19th-century Hungarian people
Hungarian editors
Hungarian publishers (people)
Ignaz Semmelweis
Hungarian surgeons